The Jackie Parker Trophy is a Canadian Football League trophy that is awarded annually to the Most Outstanding Rookie in the West Division, since 1974.  Each team in the West Division nominates a candidate from which a winner is chosen, and either this winner or the winner of the Frank M. Gibson Trophy will receive the Canadian Football League Most Outstanding Rookie Award. The award is named after former CFL star player and coach Jackie Parker.

Before 1974, the Dr. Beattie Martin Trophy was originally awarded to the West's Most Outstanding Rookie before being repurposed.  In 1995, as part of the failed American expansion, the Parker trophy was given to the most outstanding rookie in the North Division.

Jackie Parker Trophy winners

2022 - Dalton Schoen (WR), Winnipeg Blue Bombers
2021 – Jordan Williams (LB), BC Lions
2020 – season cancelled - covid 19
2019 – Nate Holley (LB), Calgary Stampeders
2018 – Jordan Williams-Lambert (WR), Saskatchewan Roughriders
2017 – Marken Michel (WR), Calgary Stampeders
2016 – DaVaris Daniels (WR), Calgary Stampeders
2015 – Derel Walker (WR), Edmonton Eskimos
2014 – Dexter McCoil (LB), Edmonton Eskimos
2013 – Brett Jones (OL), Calgary Stampeders
2012 – Jabar Westerman (LB), BC Lions 
2011 – J. C. Sherritt (LB), Edmonton Eskimos
2010 – Solomon Elimimian (LB), BC Lions 
2009 – Martell Mallett (RB), BC Lions
2008 – Weston Dressler (SB), Saskatchewan Roughriders
2007 – Cameron Wake (DE), BC Lions
2006 – Aaron Hunt (DT), BC Lions
2005 – Gavin Walls (DE), Winnipeg Blue Bombers
2004 – Nikolas Lewis (WR), Calgary Stampeders
2003 – Frank Cutolo (WR), BC Lions
2002 – Jason Clermont (SB), BC Lions
2001 – Barrin Simpson (LB), BC Lions
2000 – George White (LB), Saskatchewan Roughriders
1999 – Paul Lacoste (LB), BC Lions
1998 – Steve Muhammad (DB), BC Lions
1997 – B.J. Gallis (LB), BC Lions
1996 – Kelvin Anderson (RB), Calgary Stampeders
1995 – Shalon Baker (WR), Edmonton Eskimos
1994 – Carlos Huerta (K/P), Las Vegas Posse
1993 – Brian Wiggins (WR), Calgary Stampeders
1992 – Bruce Covernton (OT), Calgary Stampeders
1991 – Jon Volpe (RB), BC Lions
1990 – Lucius Floyd (RB), Saskatchewan Roughriders
1989 – Darrell Wallace (RB), BC Lions
1988 – Jeff Fairholm (SB), Saskatchewan Roughriders
1987 – Stanley Blair (CB), Edmonton Eskimos
1986 – Harold Hallman (DT), Calgary Stampeders
1985 – Michael Gray (DT), BC Lions
1984 – Stewart Hill (LB), Edmonton Eskimos
1983 – Willard Reaves (RB), Winnipeg Blue Bombers
1982 – Mervyn Fernandez (WR), BC Lions
1981 – Vince Goldsmith (LB), Saskatchewan Roughriders
1980 – William Miller (RB), Winnipeg Blue Bombers
1979 – Brian Kelly (WR), Edmonton Eskimos
1978 – Joe Poplawski (WR), Winnipeg Blue Bombers
1977 – Leon Bright (WR), BC Lions
1976 – John Sciarra (QB), BC Lions
1975 – Larry Cameron (LB), BC Lions
1974 – Tom Scott (WR), Winnipeg Blue Bombers

Outstanding Rookie in the West Division prior to the trophy

 1973 – Lorne Richardson (DB), Saskatchewan Roughriders
 1972 – Tom Campana (RB), Saskatchewan Roughriders

See Dr. Beattie Martin Trophy to view other recipients of an award given to the most outstanding rookie in the West Division.

References
CFL Publications: 2011 Facts, Figures & Records''

Canadian Football League trophies and awards